The Polonsky conspiracy, also known as the Polonsky plot or Polonsky affair, was an attempt by Ukrainian Bolsheviks to overthrow the Makhnovshchina during the autumn of 1919.

Prepared by the revolutionary committees of Oleksandrivsk and Katerynoslav, the plan was to assassinate Nestor Makhno and other members of the insurgent high command, following which pro-Bolshevik units of the insurgent army would seize power in the region. However, the plot was uncovered and suppressed by the Kontrrazvedka, the Makhnovist counterintelligence division. Yevgeny Polonsky and other members of the conspiracy were arrested and sentenced to execution by firing squad.

The planned coup and the fallout that resulted from its suppression exacerbated the worsening relations between the Makhnovists and Bolsheviks, which culminated in the outbreak of an all-out conflict between them in January 1920.

Background
During the early months of the Ukrainian Civil War, the anarchist Black Guards and the communist Red Guards had fought side-by-side against the forces of Ukrainian nationalism. After anarchist insurgents achieved victory over the Central Powers at the battle of Dibrivka, they found themselves up against the nascent White movement and resolved to integrate themselves into the ranks of the Red Army. This arrangement didn't last long, as political differences between the Bolsheviks and the Makhnovists culminated in a split, with the anarchists resigning command and retreating into the west. Meanwhile, the Red Army quit Ukraine entirely, causing a number of defections to the ranks of the nascent Revolutionary Insurgent Army of Ukraine. In August 1919, members of the Red Army's , including one Yevgeny Polonsky, defected to the insurgents at Pomichna.

Following the Insurgent Army's defeat of the Volunteer Army at the Battle of Peregonovka, the Makhnovshchina expanded its reach throughout southern Ukraine. In the occupied territory, the Revolutionary Insurgent Army proclaimed freedom of speech, freedom of the press, freedom of assembly and freedom of association for all factions of left-wing politics. With the White movement effectively defeated in the region, the main danger to the Makhnovshchina became the Bolsheviks, who were continuing to carry out underground anti-Makhnovist activities.

Plot
While preparations were being made for the Fourth Regional Congress in Oleksandrivsk, the local revolutionary committee met to discuss plans for a coup d'état. The plot was headed by the pro-Bolshevik insurgent commander Yevgeny Polonsky, who led the Insurgent Army's 3rd Crimean Regiment (later known as the Iron Regiment) and was a delegate to the upcoming Congress.

Financed in part by a loan from the bourgeoisie of Oleksandrivsk, the committee planned to mobilize armed workers' detachments and have them join up with the Iron Regiment at its headquarters in Nikopol, seize the city and make it their centre of operations. The committee recruited mutinous insurgents from former units of the Red Army, and packed command posts of the Insurgent Army with members of the Communist Party of Ukraine (CPU), even successfully electing one of their own members (P. Novitsky) to the Military Revolutionary Council (VRS) at the Oleksandrivsk Congress. Polonsky also managed to get himself appointed as commander of the Nikopol Military District, but was removed from his post towards the end of October 1919, on charges of spreading Bolshevik propaganda. Nevertheless, their subversive activity eventually resulted in CPU cells being established in almost every insurgent unit, with the exception of those commanded by Foma Kozhyn and Fedir Shchus. The CPU, which by this time controlled the entire 3rd and 33rd Divisions, justified the existence of their cells to the Kontrrazvedka by claiming that it was part of an attempt to reconcile the Insurgent Army with the Red Army, and to prevent conflict from breaking out between the two factions.

By the end of November, the army had been beset by epidemic typhus, which eventually killed 35,000 insurgents. In Nikopol, the centre of both the plot and the epidemic, the activities of the 2nd Azov Corps were limited by low morale, which provided the mutiny with more support. When the Insurgent Army quit Oleksandrivsk, the conspirators followed the Makhnovist leadership to Katerynoslav, where the CPU established another underground committee and began carrying out anti-Makhnovist agitation, in an attempt to demoralise the local insurgent garrison. The garrison's commander, Lashkevich, confronted the local Bolsheviks and threatened to arrest them, demanding the dissolution of the cells in his own 13th Regiment. But this was blocked by the VRS, which resolved to uphold freedom of association for the Bolsheviks.

Despite the movements of the plot, the Iron Regiment's deputy commander quickly confessed to the insurgent staff and became a double agent for the Kontrrazvedka, which monitored the conspiracy for six weeks. The insurgent counterintelligence discovered that Polonsky had transferred to Katerynoslav in order to poison Nestor Makhno and other members of the insurgent high command, including those being treated for typhus. The insurgent staff didn't believe that a coup was possible, as only 10% of the army consisted of former Red soldiers and only 1% were members of the CPU. They commissioned the Kontrrazvedka to investigate, which confirmed the existence of the conspiracy and assigned an agent to infiltrate it.

Execution
On the day of a planned conference for the insurgent command, set in Katerynoslav on 4 December 1919, the conspirators held another meeting, in which they briefed the Central Committee of the CPU on their plans. They declared their intention to poison the insurgent high command, including Makhno himself.

After the conference ended, in the middle of the night, Polonsky invited Makhno and other members of the insurgent high command back to his apartment for a party. But when he opened the door, expecting his guests, he was greeted by the Kontrrazvedka, led by Semen Karetnyk, who arrested him and his accomplices.

One of the conspirators was discovered with documents from their earlier meetings, and the food and beverages that would have been served at the party were found to have been poisoned. The Kontrrazvedka swiftly sentenced the leaders of the conspiracy to death and, on 5 December, they were executed by firing squad. Fearing the same treatment, the remaining conspirators went underground.

Aftermath

Members of the CPU, supported by members of the Nabat such as Peter Arshinov and Volin, appealed for the remaining conspirators to receive a public trial, but the insurgent command had already given orders to immediately shoot those that still occupied positions of command in the army. When the executions were challenged by the VRS, Makhno justified his actions by detailing the plans of the conspirators and even claiming that they were agents of the White movement. After a brief confrontation between the two, the VRS agreed to establish a commission to investigate the affair, which was to be led by Volin, Viktor Bilash and Mikhail Uralov. But the unilateral executions of the conspirators had already caused a rift within the Insurgent Army, as both communists and anarchists contested it, due to such actions technically requiring sanction from civilian bodies of the Makhnovshchina. The VRS and the insurgent command eventually formed an agreement, in which the former would confine itself to civilian affairs, while the latter would be solely concerned with military matters.

Despite the fallout from the conspiracy, the Bolsheviks did not fall under heavier persecution in the aftermath, with the party still being able to operate openly and the Zvezda remaining in publication. In the subsequent weeks, the Bolshevik underground in Katerynoslav reorganised itself. By 1 January 1920, the city's revolutionary committee seized power and made way for the Red Army to reenter the city, reestablishing the rule of the Ukrainian Soviet Socialist Republic.

References

Bibliography
 
 
 
 
 

1919 in Ukraine
1910s coups d'état and coup attempts
Coup d'état attempts in Europe
Communism in Ukraine
December 1919 events
Failed assassination attempts in Europe
History of Dnipro
Makhnovshchina
Mutinies
Political repression in Ukraine
Anti-anarchism